The KTM Komuter Northern Sector is one of the five KTM Komuter services run by Malaysian rail operator Keretapi Tanah Melayu. The service was introduced on 11 September 2015 following the completion of the Ipoh-Padang Besar Electrification and Double-Tracking Project in December 2014, which also saw the extension of the ETS service to Padang Besar from Ipoh.

Currently, the KTM Komuter Northern Sector consists of two routes, namely the – route and the – route. The lines share the tracks with the ETS service; the Komuter trains call at stations not served by the ETS.

Lines, stations and rolling stock
The KTM Komuter Northern Section consists of two routes:
  –
  –

The two route network effective since 4 November 2021 when the route between  –  replaced the earlier – route. The ,  and  Stations are the shared interchange stations between the two lines.

The train that are used to run on this track were the Class 83 and Class 92 while the other sets are used to operate on the Central sector.

Schedule 
KTM Komuter Northern Sector has 2 routes/lines, in which they have their own schedule.

History
The KTM Komuter Northern Service was introduced on 11 September 2015. The initial service ran between Gurun in Kedah, Butterworth in Penang and Kamunting in Perak. With the introduction of KTM Komuter services on this section, the KTM ETS services that ran between these stations have ceased.

On 17 January 2016, the original Gurun-Butterworth-Kamunting route was replaced with two separate routes: Butterworth-Gurun and Butterworth-Kamunting. These two lines together with the Butterworth-Padang Besar line operated until 1 July 2016, when the Butterworth-Gurun route was scrapped.

See also 
 Keretapi Tanah Melayu
 KTM Intercity
 KTM West Coast Line
 KTM East Coast Line
 KTM ETS
 KTM Komuter
  Seremban Line
  Port Klang Line
 
 Malaysian Railway System

References

External links 
 Keretapi Tanah Melayu official website
 Keretapi.com – Railway Fan website
 Keretapi Tanah Melayu Railway Fan Club website
 KTMB Media Release – KTM Komuter Shuttle Northern Sector

Metre gauge railways in Malaysia
Railway services introduced in 2015
KTM Komuter
2015 establishments in Malaysia